Bally Records was a small record label located at 203 N. Wabash Ave. in Chicago, Illinois. Its full name was Bally Recording Corporation and it was a subsidiary of slot machine and pinball maker Bally Manufacturing. The parent company saw and filled a need to supply records to the coin-operated phonograph (juke box) industry.  The record division was launched in 1955 with much publicity, in such publications as Billboard Magazine, with Chicago entertainer, Lou Breese named as executive vice president. It was short lived and the last records were produced in 1957.  As was usual at the time, records were issued in three speeds: 33, 45, and 78 rpm. Sparton Records of Canada released several Bally sides. The best known record issued on Bally is "I Dreamed" by Betty Johnson (Bally 1020), which peaked on the Billboard Hot 100 at No. 9 early in 1957.

Artists
Betty Johnson
Bob Carroll
Caesar Giovannini
Claude Bolling
David Bee & His Orchestra
Ike Cole
Ted Weems
Thurl Ravenscroft
Win Stracke
Lou Breese
The Highlights

Sources

Johnson, Betty, In Her Own Words, (2007) Bliss Tavern Productions, 
Billboard Magazine, Dec. 17, 1955, p. 40
Billboard Magazine, Oct. 14, 1957, p. 22
Billboard Magazine, Nov. 26, 1955, p. 100

See also
List of record labels

Pop record labels
Defunct record labels of the United States